1994 Gamba Osaka season

Review and events

League results summary

League results by round

Competitions

Domestic results

J.League

Suntory series

NICOS series

Emperor's Cup

J.League Cup

Player statistics

 † player(s) joined the team after the opening of this season.

Transfers

In:

Out:

Transfers during the season

In
none

Out

Awards
none

References

Other pages
 J. League official site
 Gamba Osaka official site

Gamba Osaka
Gamba Osaka seasons